Karl E. Peters is a Professor Emeritus of Religion at Rollins College, Winter Park, FL, and former adjunct professor of philosophy, University of Hartford, Hartford, CT and adjunct professor of religion and science, Meadville Lombard Theological School, Chicago.  He also is the former editor and then co-editor of Zygon: Journal of Religion and Science, and is a founder, organizer, and first President of the University Unitarian Universalist Society in central Florida.  His scholarly research and teaching focuses on issues in science and religion, including the concept of God and evolution, epistemology in science and religion, world religions and the environment, and religious and philosophical issues in medicine.

Peters has been for many years a member and lecturer at the Institute on Religion in an Age of Science where he has been active in the development of Religious Naturalism. He has six times served as co-chair of the annual conference.
2014 - Science and Religion in a Globalizing World 
2011 - Doing Good, Doing Bad, Doing Nothing: Scientific and Religious Perspectives
2005 - Varieties of Spiritual Transformation: Scientific and Religious Perspectives 
1997 - The Evolution of Morality                               
1992 - Global Ecology and Human Destiny                
1986 - Free Will: Is It Possible and Is it Desirable?
1978 - The Future of the Child: Religious and Scientific Perspectives

Peters' current focus in on developing a Christian Religious Naturalism.

Major publications
Dancing With the Sacred: Evolution, Ecology, and God - Trinity Press International, 2002, 
Spiritual Transformations: Science, Religion, and Human Becoming  -  Augsberg Fortress - eBooks Account, 2008, 
 Video - Beginning Reflections of One Unitarian Universalist on Cloning and Genetic Technologies

References

Religious naturalists
Living people
University of Hartford faculty
Rollins College faculty
Presidents of the Institute on Religion in an Age of Science
Year of birth missing (living people)